This article lists diplomatic missions resident in the Republic of Poland. At present, the capital city of Warsaw hosts 97 embassies. Several countries have ambassadors accredited to Poland, with most being resident in Brussels, Berlin or Moscow. This listing excludes honorary consulates.

Diplomatic missions in Warsaw

Consulates in Poland

Embassies to open

 Warsaw (Embassy to open)

Accredited embassies
Resident in Berlin unless noted

 (Andorra la Vella)
 (Nassau)

 (London)

 (Moscow)

 
 (Moscow)
 (Paris)

 
 (Paris)
 (Brussels)

 (Brussels)

 (Palikir)
 (Brussels)
 (Libreville)
 (Brussels)
 (Rome/Vatican)

 (Moscow)
 (London)

 (Rome)

 (Bern)

 

 (New York City)

 (Brussels)

 (New York City)

 (Brussels)

 (New York City)
 (Singapore City)
 (Moscow)
 (Brussels)

 (Brussels)

 (Brussels)

See also
Foreign relations of Poland
List of diplomatic missions of Poland
Visa requirements for Polish citizens

Notes

References

Warsaw Diplomatic List

List
Poland
Diplomatic missions

pl:Placówki dyplomatyczne i konsularne Polski na świecie oraz obcych państw w Polsce